Abbeyfeale railway station served the market town of Abbeyfeale in County Limerick, Ireland.

History

Opened by the Limerick and Kerry Railway, by the beginning of the 20th century the station was run by the Great Southern and Western Railway. It was absorbed into the Great Southern Railways in 1925.

The station was then nationalised, passing on to the Córas Iompair Éireann as a result of the Transport Act 1944 which took effect from 1 January 1945. It was closed in 1963 and has since been owned privately.

References 

 
 

Disused railway stations in County Limerick
Railway stations opened in 1880
Railway stations closed in 1963